Longué-Jumelles is a commune in the Maine-et-Loire department in western France.

Longué-Jumelles is twinned with Calverton, Nottinghamshire in England.

Population

See also
Communes of the Maine-et-Loire department

References

Longuejumelles
Anjou